Seoul Metropolitan Subway Line 4 (dubbed The Blue Line) of the Seoul Metropolitan Subway is a long line crossing from the southwest to the northeast across the Seoul National Capital Area.  The central section in Seoul City is operated by Seoul Metro with some trains offering through service to Korail's Ansan and Gwacheon Lines. The southern terminus (Oido) is in Jeongwang 4-dong, Siheung City, and the northern terminus (Jinjeop) is in Jinjeop-eup, Namyangju-si, Gyeonggi-do. In 2022, the Seoul Metro operated section had an annual ridership of 219,587,000 or about 601,608 passengers per day.

Northbound trains that run on the Ansan and Gwacheon Lines terminate at Danggogae, except during night time where they short-turn at various stations. Southbound trains that run on the Ansan and Gwacheon Lines terminate at Oido or Ansan. All trains from Jinjeop short-turn at Sadang, though some short-turn trains to Sadang start at Danggogae or terminate one station south at Namtaeryeong.

Express train service stops at all stations between Danggogae and Sanbon, then at Sangnoksu, Jungang, Choji, Ansan, Jeongwang, and Oido. The express service only operates during rush hours on weekdays.

History 
1985:
20 April: Line 4 is officially opened from Sanggye to Samseon-gyo.

1993:
21 April: The line is extended northward from Sanggye to Danggogae.

1994:
1 April: The line is extended southward from Sadang to Ansan when a section of the Gwacheon Line (from Seonbawi to Indeogwon) and Namtaeryeong Station open.

2000:
28 July: The line is extended westward from Ansan to Oido.

2003
18 July: Surisan Station opens as an in-fill station on the Ansan Line section.

2010
 Ansan Line AM express service is launched in the northbound direction only (starting from Ansan). Trains stopped at Jungang, Sangnoksu, and Sanbon, before continuing local up to Danggogae.

2014
 1 September: Southbound PM express service is launched (terminating at Ansan). Trains make the same stops as their AM express service counterparts.

2017
 7 July: Express service is extended to Oido. In addition to the stops they made before, trains make all stops between Ansan and Oido.

2020
 12 September: Express service is modified, with trains now stopping at Choji but skipping Singiloncheon.

2022:
19 March: The line is extended northward from Danggogae to Jinjeop.

Future 
Express services are planned to start skipping various stations north of Sanbon station by 2023 to cut travel times.

Stations

Depots, junctions, and points of interest 
(from Danggogae to Oido)
 Turnback siding (underground) after Danggogae Station 
 Changdong Depot (used for Seoul Metro class 4000)
 Connecting track to Line 3 before Chungmuro Station
 Dongjak Bridge
 Chongshin Univ. – Sadang scissors crossover
 Hanyang University, ERICA Campus
 Turnback siding (underground) after Sadang Station
 Namtaeryong–Seonbawi track crossing point (flying crossover, switch from right to left-hand traffic, or vice versa)
 The voltage/current switches between DC 1,500 V ↔ AC 25,000 V
 Ansan Depot (used for simple maintenance of Korail Class 341000 train)
 Siheung Depot (used for Korail Class 341000 maintenance and also for heavy maintenance of Korail Class 311000 trains operated on Line 1)
 The largest scale of shell mounds in the South Korean west coast in Oido

Rolling stock

Current

Seoul Metro 
 Seoul Metro 4000 series
 1st generation, DC only: 4-01~4-26 (only allowed between Jinjeop & Sadang)
 1st generation, DC & AC: 4-51~4-71
 2nd generation: 4-81~4-85

Korail 
 Korail Class 341000 (ex-Korail Class 2030)
 1st generation: 341-01~341-25
 2nd generation: 341-26~341-30
 3rd generation: 341-31~341-37
 4th generation: 341-38~341-55
 Trains 341-31~341-32 are temporary running on Line 1.
 Trains 341-38~341-55 are trail running or being manufactured in factories

Former

Seoul Metro 
 Seoul Metro wide-width GEC chopper resistor controlled electric car (1985–1993; transferred to Seoul Subway Line 3)

Korail
Korail Class 1000 (Ansan Line only, transferred to Seoul Subway Line 1)

See also 
 Subways in South Korea
 Seoul Metropolitan Subway

References 

 
Seoul Metropolitan Subway lines
Railway lines opened in 1985